Nils Politt (born 6 March 1994) is a German cyclist, who currently rides for UCI WorldTeam .

Career
In September 2015  announced that Politt had signed a two-year contract with the team from 2016, and that he would make his debut for the team as a stagiaire at the Tour de l'Eurométropole later that month. In June 2017, he was named in the startlist for the Tour de France.

Bora–Hansgrohe (2021–present)
In July 2021, Politt won the twelfth stage of the Tour de France, having featured as part of an initial thirteen-rider breakaway, before making a solo attack with just under  remaining. The following month, he won a stage and the general classification at the Deutschland Tour. In May 2022, he won at Rund um Köln.

Major results

2012
 2nd Time trial, National Junior Road Championships
2013
 2nd Time trial, National Under-23 Road Championships
2014
 1st  Time trial, National Under-23 Road Championships
 2nd Eschborn-Frankfurt City Loop U23
 3rd Overall Tour de Berlin
2015
 National Under-23 Road Championships
1st  Road race
2nd Time trial
 2nd Rund um Düren
 3rd Kattekoers
 6th Overall Bayern–Rundfahrt
2016
 3rd Time trial, National Road Championships
 3rd Overall Driedaagse van West-Vlaanderen
 5th Le Samyn
 6th Tour de l'Eurométropole
 9th Overall Three Days of De Panne
2017
 National Road Championships
3rd Time trial
4th Road race
 6th Overall Étoile de Bessèges
2018
 2nd Overall Deutschland Tour
1st Stage 4
 3rd Münsterland Giro
 5th Time trial, National Road Championships
 7th Paris–Roubaix
2019
 2nd  Team relay, UCI Road World Championships
 National Road Championships
2nd Time trial
4th Road race
 2nd Paris–Roubaix
 4th Rund um Köln
 5th Overall Tour of Britain
 5th Tour of Flanders
 6th E3 Binckbank Classic
2021
 1st  Overall Deutschland Tour
1st Stage 3
 Tour de France
1st Stage 12
 Combativity award Stage 12
 3rd Overall Étoile de Bessèges
 4th Time trial, National Road Championships
 7th Kuurne–Brussels–Kuurne
 9th Bredene Koksijde Classic
 10th Omloop Het Nieuwsblad
2022
 National Road Championships
1st  Road race
3rd Time trial
 1st Rund um Köln
 5th Dwars door Vlaanderen
  Combativity award Stage 15 Tour de France
2023
 7th Omloop Het Nieuwsblad

Grand Tour general classification results timeline

Classics results timeline

References

External links

 

1994 births
Living people
Cyclists from Cologne
German male cyclists
German Tour de France stage winners